Gustavo Alejandro Villarruel (born 23 February 1993) is an Argentine professional footballer who plays as a forward for Güemes.

Career
Villarruel started his Colón career in 2014, making his debut on 4 March in an Argentine Primera División draw at home to Godoy Cruz. In total, he made five appearances in his first season of 2013–14 which finished with relegation. In Primera B Nacional, Villarruel scored in four straight matches throughout August and September 2014 with goals against Gimnasia y Esgrima, Nueva Chicago, Aldosivi and Guaraní Antonio Franco. One further goal arrived versus Ferro Carril Oeste during 2014 as the club won instant promotion back to the Primera División. He played twenty-four times and scored once in the subsequent season.

On 2 February 2016, Villarruel joined fellow top-flight team San Martín on loan until June 2017. He made his first appearance in a 4–3 defeat to Huracán on 9 April. He went on to feature in thirty games and scored four goals across 2016 and 2016–17. In June 2017, San Martín signed Villarruel permanently.

Career statistics
.

References

External links

1993 births
Living people
People from San Lorenzo Department
Argentine footballers
Association football forwards
Argentine Primera División players
Primera Nacional players
Club Atlético Colón footballers
San Martín de San Juan footballers
Club Atlético Tigre footballers
Instituto footballers
Sportspeople from Santa Fe Province